Kandel is a surname.  Kandel is a common name among Ashkenazi Jews, indicating an ancestor from the town of Kandel in Rhineland-Palatinate, Germany.  Notable people with the surname include:

In Europe and Americas
David Kandel (1520–1592), artist
Eric R. Kandel, neuroscientist
Eugene Kandel, economist
Felix Kandel, historian
Harry Kandel, bandleader
Isaac Leon Kandel, educator
Jessica Kandel, surgeon
Lenore Kandel, poet
Michael Kandel, science fiction author
Paul Kandel, actor
Susan Kandel, art critic and writer
Ellen Kandeler, biologist and agricultural scientist specializing in soil biology

In Nepal
Kandel is a surname of people belonging to Bahun or Chhetri  from Nepal. It is generally believed to be of Kumaoni origin.
Yam Lal Kandel, Nepalese politician
Devendra Raj Kandel, Nepalese politician

References